The Orto Botanico Comunale di Lucca is a botanical garden located at Via del Giardino Botanico, 14, Lucca, Italy, and operated by the city. It is open daily during the warmer months, and weekday mornings off-season. An admission fee is charged.

The garden was established in 1820 by Marie Louise, Duchess of Parma, and contains a number of mature plantings of botanical interest. Its site is roughly triangular, set within a corner of Lucca's city wall, and organized into two main sections. One contains the gardens proper with an arboretum, pond, and smaller plantings; the other contains the greenhouse, botanical school, and laboratories. The Museo Botanico "Cesare Bicchi" contains a herbarium and archive.

See also 
 List of botanical gardens in Italy

External links 
 Orto Botanico Comunale di Lucca
 University of Modena garden listing for Lucca

Botanical gardens in Italy
Buildings and structures in Lucca
Gardens in Tuscany